John C. Howard (1 July 1930 – 28 May 1983) was an American film editor. He was nominated for an Academy Award for Best Film Editing for the film Blazing Saddles (1974). He also won the BAFTA Award for Best Editing for Butch Cassidy and the Sundance Kid in 1970, which he shared with Richard C. Meyer. 

He worked as a film editor for such films as Young Frankenstein, Blazing Saddles and History of the World, Part I.

References

External links

1930 births
1983 deaths
American Cinema Editors
American film editors
Best Editing BAFTA Award winners